Leonardo Boldrini (16th century) was an Italian painter of the Renaissance. He painted an altarpiece, whose panels are now hanging apart in the church of San Gallo near Zogno.

References

Year of death unknown
16th-century Italian painters
Italian male painters
Renaissance painters
Year of birth unknown